Regret is a negative conscious and emotional reaction to personal past acts and behaviors.

Regret or Regrets may also refer to:

Music 
 Regret (album), an album by Japanese music production unit I've Sound
 Regrets (EP), an EP by Cesium137
 "Regret" (New Order song), 1993
 "Regret" (LeToya Luckett song), 2009
 "Regret" (Mai Hoshimura song), 2008
 "Regret" (The Gazette song), 2006
 "Regret", a song from Fiona Apple's album The Idler Wheel...
 "Regret", a song from St. Vincent's self-titled album
 "Regret" (Everything Everything song), 2015
 "Regrets" (Mylène Farmer and Jean-Louis Murat song), 1991
 "Regrets" (James Brown song), 1980
 "Regrets", a song from Jay-Z's debut album Reasonable Doubt
 "Regrets", a song from Ben Folds Five's album The Unauthorized Biography of Reinhold Messner
 "Regrets", a song from the Eurythmics' album Touch
 "Regrets", a song from Reks' album Straight, No Chaser

Other uses 

 Regret, Tennessee, a former unincorporated community in the United States
 Regret (Halo), one of the Prophets from the game of Halo 2
 Regret (decision theory), the ratio or difference between the actual payoff and the best one
 Regret (horse) (1912–1934), a champion racehorse
 Regret Stakes, an American Throughbred horse race
 Regret (1814 ship)